Transberingia is a genus of plants found in Russia, Greenland, and North America. It is in the family Brassicaceae.

References

Brassicaceae genera
Brassicaceae